Stanislav Rajdl (born June 26, 1911, date of death unknown) was a Czech boxer who competed in the 1936 Summer Olympics for Czechoslovakia. In 1936 he was eliminated in the first round of the welterweight class after losing his fight to Raúl Rodríguez.

External links
 

1911 births
Year of death missing
Czechoslovak male boxers
Welterweight boxers
Olympic boxers of Czechoslovakia
Boxers at the 1936 Summer Olympics
Czech male boxers